Les Variations was a French rock band from the late 1960s to mid-1970s, that sang in English and was known for its rock guitar-based music. Its three members were born in Morocco and were of Jewish origin. They were France's first band to headline the famed Olympia Theatre, the first to tour America, the first to sign with a US label and the first to achieve hit records in America. On their last two albums, Moroccan Roll (1974) and Cafe de Paris (1975), their compositions, arrangements and lyrics contained sounds and stories of North African and Jewish Sephardic culture as well as the Hebrew songs of the band members’ youth growing up in North Africa.  With this sound, they introduced a new rock fusion which is now referred to as Moroccanroll music, which is played throughout North Africa and has influenced many western rock bands over the past four decades.

History
Three of the original four members were Moroccan Jews. Joe Leb sang vocals, Marc Tobaly played guitar, and Isaac “Jacky” Bitton was on drums. The fourth member, Jacques “Petit Pois” Grande, who played bass, is of Italian heritage. In 1971, Leb was briefly replaced by French singer Michel Chevalier. In 1975, Leb was later replaced by Tunisian born Robert Fitoussi.

Les Variations was formed in 1966 by Marc Tobaly's older brother Alain, who became the band's manager. That year they began touring throughout Europe as a great live performance band, singing songs in English of their favorite artists, such as Little Richard, Chuck Berry, Elvis Presley and The Rolling Stones, and in 1967, they began their recording career in Denmark with the release of Spics & Spack.  Returning to France in 1969, they signed with France's EMI/Pathé Records, and forged a successful recording relationship.  Les Variations were the first and certainly one of the best known rock groups from France, largely in part to their commercial record successes, their unabandoned concert and television performances, their unmatched media and press coverage, and their unique position of being the first French rock band to tour America, to sign with an American label and eventually pioneer a new style of rock music over their decade-long existence. Between 1969 and 1973, they released the bulk of their albums on Pathe Records.  Their early recordings often mimicked traits of The Rolling Stones, The Who and Led Zeppelin.

In 1972, Alain Tobably formed a partnership with Doug Yeager and Charles Benanty of Applewood Productions in New York, and the band began the second phase of their career touring and recording in America. Their only French language recording, "Je Suis Juste Un Rock'n Roller", produced by Doug Yeager and the band and backed by soul sisters Angel & Sybil, was recorded in Cincinnati's 5th Floor Recording Studios, and became their biggest hit ever, reaching No. 7 in the French pop charts. In 1973, their popular album Take it or Leave It was recorded in Memphis's Ardent Studios with producer Don Nix.

In 1974, Les Variations became the first French rock band to sign with an American label, Buddah Records while creating a more exotic and unique style reminiscent of their North African roots.  Their pioneering introduction of sounds and styles taken from their Moroccan heritages, was exemplified in the albums Moroccan Roll (1974, produced by Ralph Moss), and Cafe de Paris (1975, produced by Lewis Merenstein & Michael Wendroff), which would influence rock bands in America, Europe and Africa for the next several generations. During the recording and subsequent touring of these Buddah albums, the band added the American keyboard player/singer Jim Morris; and for the next album (Cafe de Paris) and its tours, they added the French/Tunisian/singer/guitarist/composer Robert Fitoussi and the French/Tunisian violinist of Arabic music, Maurice Meimoun.  This 1975 album reached the Billboard Top 200 Album Charts in America, while their single "Superman, Superman", reached No. 36 in the U.S. Pop Charts.  During this 1974–1975 period, they became the first French rock band to headline the famed Olympia Theatre in Paris; and the only French band to ever headline the national American TV concert show The Midnight Special and the national American radio concert special King Biscuit Flower Hour.

In the summer of 1975, after the band's national tour of America in support of their charted album, Robert Fitoussi choose to branch out on his solo career as F. R. David. Jacques Grande and Maurice Meimoun also left the band at that time.  Les Variations reformed at their Cincinnati band house and studio with Tobaly, Bitton and Morris and the addition of Americans singer Carl Storie and bassist/singer Albritton McClain.  Unfortunately, as they finally were able to gain measurable success in America with their major tours and hit record, Les Variations gave their last concert at Philadelphia's Academy of Music on December 7, 1975, and disbanded two weeks later on December 21, 1975.

In 1977, Les Variations reformed for a historic recording session for CBS Records International. Jac Hammer, composer of many classic rock songs, such as "Great Balls of Fire," wrote an anthem the night Anwar Sadat flew to Israel to make peace.  Three days later, Richie Havens & Les Variations recorded "Shalom, Salem Aleicum" (produced by Charles Benanty, Doug Yeager and David Wilkes), which CBS released immediately throughout the Middle East, and it became a #1 hit in Israel, Egypt and Jordan.          
 
Over the course of their career, Les Variations became the first French rock band to tour Europe, Africa and America.  Over their ten years on the road they toured with many major acts of the era, including: Bachman–Turner Overdrive, Kiss, The Jimi Hendrix Experience, Cream, Yes, Guess Who, Taste, Queen, Uriah Heep, Rush, Kraftwerk and Aerosmith, to name a few.

In 1993, Maurice Meimoun died in Paris.

In 2009, a Tribute to Les Variations was presented before 250,000 fans at the L'Boulevard Rock Music Festival in Casablanca, Morocco, honoring the band as the Fathers of Moroccanroll music. 
     
Les Variations bassist, Jacques "Petit Pois" Grande, died on June 16, 2011, from cancer, near his home of Davis, California.

Discography

 Nador (1969)
 Take It or Leave It (1973)
 Moroccan Roll (1974)
 Cafe De Paris (1975)

Current members

 Laura Mayne – vocals (2012–)
 Marc Tobali – guitar (1966–1975 & 2012–)
 Franck Sitbon – keyboards (2012–)
 Philippe Balma – bass (2012–)
 Pierra Veuillot – drums (2012–)

Former members
 Jo Philippe Lebb – vocals (1966–1973)
 Michel Chevalier – vocals (1971)
 Robert Fitoussi (aka F. R. David) – vocals (1973–1975)
 Maurice Meimoun – violin (1975)
 Jacques Micheli – guitar (1966)
 Jean-Pierre "Rolling" Azoulay – guitar (1966)
 Albritton McClain – guitar
 Jim Morris – keyboards (1974–1975)
 Guy de Baer – bass (1966)
 Jacques "Petit Pois" Grande – bass (1966–1975)
 Alain Suzan – bass (1972) ALAIN SUZAN NAISSANCE NICE 1945 CHANT BASS GROUP VARIATIONS GROUPE ALICE 1970 1972
 Isaac "Jacky" Bitton – drums (1966–1975)

Other information
 Proud of his Jewish heritage, Bitton wore a noticeable Star of David around his neck during concerts.

References

External links
 Marc Tobaly's website
 Les Variations discography at Discogs

Musical groups established in 1968
French rock music groups
Musical groups from Paris